The Roman Catholic Ecclesiastical Region of Triveneto (Regione ecclesiastica Triveneto) is one of the sixteen ecclesiastical regions of the Roman Catholic Church in Italy. It consists of four ecclesiastical provinces and a total of fifteen dioceses and covers the three secular regions of Trentino-Alto Adige/Südtirol, Friuli-Venezia Giulia and Veneto.

Subdivisions

External links
 Map
 http://www.catholic-hierarchy.org/country/r15it.html

Triveneto